Sheykhlar or Shaikhlar or Shaykhlyar may refer to various places in Iran:
Sheykhlar, Ardabil
Sheykhlar, East Azerbaijan
Sheykhlar, Marand, East Azerbaijan Province
Sheykhlar, Golestan
Sheykhlar, Qazvin
Sheykhlar, West Azerbaijan
Sheykhlar-e Mazari, West Azerbaijan Province
Sheykhlar, Zanjan
Sheykhlar, Khodabandeh, Zanjan province

See also
Shikhlar, Armenia
Sheykhlu (disambiguation), various places in Iran